Key to Harmony is a 1935 British drama film directed by Norman Walker and starring Belle Chrystall, Fred Conyngham and Reginald Purdell. The film is a quota quickie made at British and Dominions Elstree Studios for release by Paramount Pictures. It was based on the novel Suburban Retreat by John B. Wilson. The film's art direction was by Hylton R. Oxley.

Plot summary
A woman's love life is threatened by her career success.

Cast
 Belle Chrystall as Mary Meynell  
 Fred Conyngham as Victor Barnett 
 Reginald Purdell as Tom Kirkwood  
 Olive Sloane as Nonia Sande  
 Ernest Butcher as Mr. Meynell 
 Muriel George as Mrs. Meynell  
 D. A. Clarke-Smith as Rupert Golder  
 Cyril Smith as Fred 
 Joan Harben
 Jack Knight

References

Bibliography
Chibnall, Steve. Quota Quickies: The Birth of the British 'B' Film. British Film Institute, 2007.
Low, Rachael. Filmmaking in 1930s Britain. George Allen & Unwin, 1985.
Wood, Linda. British Films, 1927–1939. British Film Institute, 1986.

External links

1935 films
1935 romantic drama films
1930s English-language films
British romantic drama films
Films set in England
Films based on British novels
Films directed by Norman Walker
Films produced by Anthony Havelock-Allan
British black-and-white films
British and Dominions Studios films
Films shot at Imperial Studios, Elstree
1930s British films